Jacqueline Rouvier (born 26 October 1949 in Notre-Dame-de-Bellecombe) is a French alpine ski racer.

External links 
 
 
 

1949 births
Living people
French female alpine skiers
Olympic alpine skiers of France
Alpine skiers at the 1976 Winter Olympics